Anthony Kramreither (August 7, 1926 – February 8, 1993) was an Austrian-Canadian film and television actor and producer. Primarily known as a producer of low-budget horror and exploitation films such as Thrillkill, The Giant Spider Invasion and Humongous, he was most noted as producer of the 1986 film Dancing in the Dark, which was a Genie Award nominee for Best Picture at the 8th Genie Awards in 1987.

Originally from Vienna, Kramreither was a stage actor in Austria and Germany before moving to Canada in 1954. In Canada, he had television acting roles in series such as Wojeck, Quentin Durgens, M.P., R.C.M.P., Adventures in Rainbow Country and Seaway, and films such as Change of Mind, Silent Friends and Babysitters, before launching his own production company, Brightstar Films, in 1972.

With Brightstar, he aspired to make serious, artistically accomplished films; his first project was a television documentary series about Nobel Prize winners, and his second was the family film Lions for Breakfast. To make money for the firm, however, he also agreed to make several low-budget commercial horror films, which quickly came to define his studio's reputation and eclipse his original ambitions. In 1983, he produced, directed and cowrote the comedy film All in Good Taste, a deliberate parody of the gap between his own goals as a producer and the low-budget mass market compromises that he was forced to make; the film would also later become noted as one of the first-ever film roles for comedic actor Jim Carrey.

When Don Haig approached him for assistance in raising funds for Dancing in the Dark, he accepted the opportunity to move back into more serious filmmaking; with its screening at the Cannes Film Festival in 1986, it became the first Kramreither-produced film to premiere at a major film festival. Other more ambitious films he produced around the same time included Flying, Confidential, Dreams Beyond Memory and Concrete Angels.

In the late 1980s, he was diagnosed with Parkinson's disease. His final film as a producer was the 1991 film White Light, directed by Al Waxman; in the same year, he won a lifetime achievement award from the Canadian Film and Television Production Association.

He died on February 8, 1993, at his home in Richmond Hill.

Filmography 
He was a producer in all films unless otherwise noted.

Film

As an actor

As director

As writer

Miscellaneous crew

Television

As an actor

References

External links

1926 births
1993 deaths
Film producers from Ontario
Film directors from Toronto
Canadian male screenwriters
Canadian male television actors
Canadian male film actors
Austrian emigrants to Canada
Film people from Vienna
20th-century Canadian screenwriters
20th-century Canadian male actors